Daphne macrantha is a shrub, of the family Thymelaeaceae.  It is native to China, specifically northeastern Xizang.

Description
The shrub is evergreen, and grows up to 30 cm tall. Its branches creep and are purplish red or brown. It is often found among rocks on north-facing open hillsides at 4200–4300 m in altitude.

References

macrantha